The Alaska Kid is a 1991 German-Russian-Polish television miniseries, based on Jack London's 1912 short story anthology, Smoke Bellew. It was directed by James Hill. First broadcast on the German ZDF network in December 1993, the series stars Mark Pillow as "The Alaska Kid" Jack Bellew, a newspaper reporter on his beat during the Klondike Gold Rush in Alaska.

Episodes

See also
List of German television series

References

External links
 

Television series based on American novels
Klondike Gold Rush
Television shows set in Alaska
ZDF original programming
German drama television series
1990s German television miniseries
Russian television miniseries
1993 German television series debuts
1993 German television series endings
1990s Russian television series
1993 Russian television series debuts
1993 Russian television series endings
Television series based on short fiction
Television shows based on works by Jack London